Jean-Jacques Pierre (born 23 January 1981) is a Haitian football coach and former professional footballer who played as a centre back. He coaches the Haiti national team.

Club career
Born in Léogâne, Jean-Jacques Pierre began his career in the youth ranks of Haitian club Cavaly. After impressing with the island club Pierre moved to Argentina joining  Arsenal de Sarandí. After one season with Arsenal Pierre joined Deportivo Morón and went on to  score an impressive seven goals as a defender. His play with Morón earned him a move to historic Uruguayan side Peñarol. While with Peñarol Pierre was a regular starter for the club and also featured during Copa Libertadores. He was voted as the best defender of the Uruguayan championship during 2004–2005.

In August 2005 he joined French club Nantes. Upon joining Nantes Pierre quickly became a first team regular. He made his debut for Nantes on 10 September 2005 in a 1–0 loss to Troyes AC. In six seasons in France he appeared in 143 league matches (including 68 Ligue 1 matches) and scored 4 goals.

International career
Pierre was the captain of the U-23 Haiti national football team, and emerged as an important player for the full national squad. He made his full national team debut in a December 2001 friendly match against El Salvador and was a Haiti squad member at the 2002 and 2007 Gold Cup Finals. Also, he played in two World Cup qualifying matches in 2004. According to the Haitian press, on 25 March 2009, Pierre announced his retirement from the national side citing false accusations against him. Also, Pierre explained he was not as much valued in the national team as he was with Nantes. However, he returned to the national team and participated in 2010 World Cup qualifying matches.

Managerial statistics

Honors
Haiti
Caribbean Cup bronze: 2014

References

External links
 
 
 
 Profile – fcnhisto.com 
 

1981 births
Living people
Association football defenders
Haitian footballers
Haiti international footballers
2002 CONCACAF Gold Cup players
2007 CONCACAF Gold Cup players
2013 CONCACAF Gold Cup players
2015 CONCACAF Gold Cup players
2014 Caribbean Cup players
Cavaly AS players
Arsenal de Sarandí footballers
Deportivo Morón footballers
Peñarol players
FC Nantes players
Panionios F.C. players
Stade Malherbe Caen players
Ligue Haïtienne players
Ligue 1 players
Ligue 2 players
Super League Greece players
Haitian expatriate footballers
Expatriate footballers in Argentina
Expatriate footballers in Uruguay
Expatriate footballers in France
Expatriate footballers in Greece
Haitian expatriate sportspeople in Argentina
Haitian expatriate sportspeople in Uruguay
Haitian expatriate sportspeople in France
Haitian expatriate sportspeople in Greece
People from Ouest (department)
Haitian football managers
Haiti national football team managers
Angers SCO players
Paris FC players
US Granville players
2021 CONCACAF Gold Cup managers